St George is a district of Bristol, England on the Eastern edge of the city boundary.

St George was originally outside the city boundary in Gloucestershire, the terminus of the tram line from Bristol was in Beaconsfield Road. It became a civil parish (Bristol St George) in 1866, and briefly an urban district from 1894 to 1898.  The parish and urban district were absorbed into Bristol in 1898.

Troopers' Hill chimney is a local landmark. St George was a mining area from the early 19th century (coal and fireclay) until 1904 when the last fireclay mines were abandoned. Troopers Hill was declared as a Local Nature Reserve (LNR) on 22 June 1995.

John Armitstead, a colliery proprietor, had a pit between Church Road and Whitehall Road, where he installed a pumping engine for raising coal. Power was generated from water by means of a fire and the device was called a fire engine. It stood on land which came to be known as the Engine Ground, this is reflected in the name of a local public house, the Fire Engine.

The St George Fountain is a Victorian water fountain on the main Church Road which forks at this point to become Clouds Hill Road to Kingswood and Summerhill Road to Hanham.

St George, along with other east Bristol suburbs such as Hanham, Kingswood and Brislington, is currently unserved by rail. The nearest stations are Lawrence Hill and Stapleton Road.

References

Areas of Bristol
Wards of Bristol